Mandy Stein (born January 14, 1975) is an American film producer and film director. Her parents are Seymour Stein and Linda S. Stein.

Early life
Stein was born in Manhattan. She graduated from Kent School in 1994 and attended Occidental College.

Career
Stein started her first project You See Me Laughin' while a student at Occidental College and took five years to complete.

Filmography

References

External links

1975 births
Living people
American documentary film directors
Kent School alumni
People from Manhattan
Film directors from New York City